Philip of Amphipolis  was a Greek writer of unknown date, remarkable for his obscenity, of which Suidas has given a sufficiently significant specimen. He wrote a history of Rhodes, which Suidas especially stigmatizes for the obscenity of its matter, a history of the Cos island and Thasiaca a history of Thasos. He wrote some other works not enumerated by Suidas. Theodorus Priscianus, an ancient medical writer, classes Philip of Amphipolis with Herodian and Iamblichus the Syrian, as a pleasant writer of amatory tales, whose works tended to allure the mind to the pursuit of pleasure. All his works appear to be lost.

References

Ancient Amphipolitans
Ancient Greek historians known only from secondary sources